Churchill High School, named after Winston Churchill, is one of the four main public high schools (and the most recently built) in the city of Livonia, Michigan, a western suburb of Detroit.  The school was created in 1968 as an add-on to the other high schools in Livonia in response to the population boom that the city saw at the time.  The first school year (1968–69), a sophomore class attended classes at nearby Franklin High School.  Beginning in the 1969–70 school year, classes were then held in the new building with a junior and sophomore class.  The first graduating class graduated in June 1971.  The school is home to the MSC (Math, Science, and Computers) program as well as the Creative and Performing Arts program (CAPA). It also has a wide variety of athletics. The Girls' Cross-Country team finished second in the state of Michigan in 2006, and the Girls' Varsity Volleyball team won the 2007 state championship. The Livonia Career Technical Center is across the street, providing all Livonia Public School students the opportunity to engage in many hands-on activities.

Math, Science, and Computer program
The Livonia Public School District provides magnet programs for the academically talented student, in grade 9 through grade 12. The magnet programs offer students the opportunity to experience an appropriately accelerated, integrated curriculum in an enriched environment with their intellectual peers. Teachers and support staffs are sensitive to the developmental issues of the particular age as well as the social/emotional issues of highly talented youngsters.

Teachers in the magnet programs at each level meet as a team on a regularly scheduled basis to integrate curricular content. Child study meetings dealing with social/emotional needs are conducted regularly in the programs.

The magnet programs include programming at the elementary level, 1–6, ACAT; middle school level, 7–8, MACAT; the high school level, 9–12 in the Math, Science and Computer Program (MSC) which is housed at Churchill High School.

The Math/Science/Computer Program, MSC, located at Churchill High School, is a four-year program that begins with a thirty-student ninth grade class. Admissions are based on previous standardized testing and a special test usually administered in a student's second year of junior high school, during the month of December. A number of students who are not initially accepted into the program (known as "alternates") may participate in a limited number of MSC classes, or may be allowed full entry if students drop out of the program at the end of a school year.

The curriculum is specifically designed for students who have an intense interest in math and science. The accelerated courses are taught at a faster pace and in greater depth. The Advance Placement, AP, Program gives students the opportunity to pursue college-level studies and receive advance placement and/or credit upon entering college. Many of the students also participate in Churchill High School's Accelerated Language Arts Program.

Notable alumni
 Charlie LeDuff, journalist and winner of Pulitzer Prize
 Zach Gowen, former WWE and TNA Wrestling star
 Judy Greer, actress and former member of CAPA
 Ryan Kesler, former professional hockey player of the Anaheim Ducks and Olympic silver medalist on Team USA
 Jonathan B. Wright, actor and former member of CAPA, starred in the original Broadway production of Spring Awakening.
 Derek Grant, Current Drummer of Alkaline Trio and former drummer of The Suicide Machines among other notable bands
 Chris Conner, professional hockey player
 Shawn Tinnes, Folk musician known by her stage name Sista Otis
Torey Krug, professional hockey player for the St. Louis Blues
Adam Bedell, member of the MLS Columbus Crew

References

External links

Churchill High School website
Livonia Public Schools

Public high schools in Michigan
Educational institutions established in 1969
Livonia, Michigan
Schools in Wayne County, Michigan
Magnet schools in Michigan
1969 establishments in Michigan